Paul Henry Michel Jouanneau (born 17 March 1959) is a former international freestyle swimmer from Brazil.

International career

Participated at the inaugural World Aquatics Championships in 1973 Belgrade, where he competed in the 400-metre freestyle. He did a time of 4:18.19, not going to the finals.

In 1974, he broke the South American record in the 400-metre freestyle, with a time of 4:11.19.

He was at the 1975 World Aquatics Championships in Cali. In the 200-metre freestyle, he finished 21st, with a time of 2:02.33, far from his personal best at this moment, 1:58.60. In the 4×200-metre freestyle, he finished 12th, with a time of 8:07.41, along with Paulo Zanetti, Eduardo Alijó Neto and Paulo Mangini. In the 100-metre freestyle, he finished 22nd, with a time of 56.24 seconds.

He was at the 1975 Pan American Games, in Mexico City. He won the bronze medal in the 4×200-metre freestyle. He also finished 7th in the 400-metre freestyle.

At the 1976 Summer Olympics, in Montreal,  he swam the 100-metre freestyle and the 100-metre backstroke, not reaching the finals.

References

External links 
 
 

1959 births
Living people
Brazilian male backstroke swimmers
Swimmers at the 1975 Pan American Games
Swimmers at the 1976 Summer Olympics
Olympic swimmers of Brazil
Brazilian male freestyle swimmers
Pan American Games bronze medalists for Brazil
Pan American Games medalists in swimming
Medalists at the 1975 Pan American Games
20th-century Brazilian people
21st-century Brazilian people